The eleventh season of ABC reality television series The Bachelor premiered on September 24, 2007. The season features Brad Womack, a 34-year-old bar owner from Austin, Texas, courting 25 women. On November 19, 2007, during the final rose ceremony, Womack became the first lead in the history of the show to reject all of the contestants.

Contestants

Biographical information according to ABC official series site, plus footnoted additions

Future appearances

The Bachelorette
DeAnna Pappas was chosen in the fourth season of The Bachelorette, while Jenni Croft made an appearance in that season as well.

The Bachelor
In 2010, Womack returned for the second time as the bachelor in the fifteenth season of The Bachelor to be aired the following year. Additionally, Pappas and Croft appeared in the premiere episode where they gave an apology to Womack.

Bachelor Pad
In 2012, Sarah Newlon returned for the third season of Bachelor Pad.  She and her partner, Chris Bukowski, were eliminated in week 8, finishing in 3rd/4th place.

Labor of Love

In 2020, Kristy Katzmann starred in the dating game show Labor of Love.

Call-out order

 The contestant received the first impression rose
 The contestant was eliminated
 The contestant received a rose during the date
 The contestant was eliminated during the date

Episodes

Ratings

References

External links
ABC: The Bachelor 11 official site
Reality TV World, Sept. 18, 2007: "ABC reveals the identities of its new 'The Bachelor' bachelorettes"

2007 American television seasons
Television shows filmed in California
Television shows filmed in Kansas
Television shows filmed in Georgia (U.S. state)
Television shows filmed in Washington, D.C.
Television shows filmed in Mexico